William "Smokey" Robinson Jr. (born February 19, 1940) is an American singer, songwriter, record producer, and former record executive director. He was the founder and front man of the Motown vocal group the Miracles, for which he was also chief songwriter and producer. He led the group from its 1955 origins as "the Five Chimes" until 1972, when he announced his retirement from the group to focus on his role as Motown's vice president. However, Robinson returned to the music industry as a solo artist the following year. Robinson left Motown Records in 1990, following the sale of the company two years earlier. 

Robinson was inducted into the Rock and Roll Hall of Fame in 1987 and was awarded the 2016 Library of Congress Gershwin Prize for his lifetime contributions to popular music. In 2022, he was inducted into the Black Music & Entertainment Walk of Fame.

Early life and early career
William Robinson Jr. was born to an African-American father and a mother of African-American and French descent into a poor family in the North End area of Detroit, Michigan. Robinson's ancestry is also part Nigerian, Scandinavian, Portuguese, and Cherokee. His uncle Claude gave him the nickname "Smokey Joe" when he was a child.  In 2012, Robinson explained:

My Uncle Claude was my favorite uncle, he was also my godfather. He and I were really, really close. He used to take me to see cowboy movies all the time when I was a little boy because I loved cowboy movies. He got a cowboy name for me, which was Smokey Joe. So from the time I was three years old if people asked me what my name was I didn't tell them my name was William, I told them my name was Smokey Joe. That's what everyone called me until I was about 12 and then I dropped the Joe part. I've heard that story about him giving it to me because I'm a light skinned black man but that's not true.

He attended Northern High School, where he was above average academically and a keen athlete, though his main interest was music, and he formed a doo-wop group named the Five Chimes. At one point, he and Aretha Franklin lived several houses from each other on Belmont; he once said he'd known Franklin since she was about five, overhearing her play the piano when he had come to play with her older brother Cecil after her family first moved to Detroit.

Robinson's interest in music started after hearing the groups Nolan Strong & the Diablos and Billy Ward and his Dominoes on the radio as a child, and he has listed Barrett Strong, a Detroit native, as a strong vocal influence. In 1955, he formed the first lineup of the Five Chimes with childhood friend Ronald White and classmate Pete Moore.

Two years later, they were renamed the Matadors and included Bobby Rogers. Another member, Emerson (Sonny) Rogers, Bobby Rogers' cousin, was replaced by his sister,  Claudette Rogers (who would marry Smokey Robinson in 1959). The group's guitarist, Marv Tarplin, joined them sometime in 1958. The Matadors began touring Detroit venues around this time. They later changed their name to the Miracles.

Career

The Miracles and Motown

In August 1957, Robinson and the Miracles met songwriter Berry Gordy after a failed audition for Brunswick Records. At that time during the audition, Robinson had brought along with him a "Big 10" notebook with 100 songs he wrote while in high school. Gordy was impressed with Robinson's vocals and even more impressed with Robinson's ambitious songwriting. With his help, the Miracles released their first single, "Got a Job", an answer song to the Silhouettes' hit single "Get a Job" on End Records. It was the beginning of a long and successful collaboration. During this time, Robinson attended college and started classes in January 1959, studying electrical engineering. He dropped out after only two months, following the Miracles' release of their first record.

Gordy formed Tamla Records, which was later reincorporated as Motown. The Miracles became one of the first acts signed to the label, although they had actually been with Gordy since before the formation of Motown Records. In late 1960, the group recorded their first hit single, "Shop Around", which became Motown's first million-selling hit record. Between 1960 and 1970, Robinson would produce 26 top forty hits with the Miracles as lead singer, chief songwriter and producer, including several top ten hits such as "You've Really Got a Hold on Me", "Mickey's Monkey", "I Second That Emotion", "Baby Baby Don't Cry" and the group's only number-one hit during their Robinson years, "The Tears of a Clown".

Other notable hits such as "Ooo Baby Baby", "Going to a Go-Go",the multi-award-winning  "The Tracks of My Tears", "(Come Round Here) I'm The One You Need", "The Love I Saw in You Was Just a Mirage" and "More Love" peaked in the top twenty. In 1965, the Miracles were the first Motown group to change their name when they released their 1965 album Going to a Go-Go as Smokey Robinson & the Miracles.

Between 1962 and 1966, Robinson was also one of the major songwriters and producers for Motown, penning many hit singles such as "Two Lovers", "The One Who Really Loves You", "You Beat Me to the Punch" and "My Guy" for Mary Wells; "The Way You Do The Things You Do", "My Girl", "Since I Lost My Baby" and "Get Ready" for the Temptations; "Stillwater" for the Four Tops; "When I'm Gone" and "Operator" for Brenda Holloway; "Don't Mess With Bill", "The Hunter Gets Captured by the Game" and "My Baby Must Be a Magician" for the Marvelettes; and "I'll Be Doggone" and "Ain't That Peculiar" for Marvin Gaye.

After the arrival of Holland–Dozier–Holland and the team of Norman Whitfield and Barrett Strong, Robinson was eclipsed as a top writer and producer for the label, and other Motown artists such as Gaye and Stevie Wonder began to compose more original material. Later in his career, Robinson wrote lyrics and music for the Contours such as "First I Look at the Purse", as well as the Four Tops' "Still Water" and The Supremes' "Floy Joy". The other Miracles—Bobby Rogers, Pete Moore, Ronnie White, and Marv Tarplin—collaborated with him as writers on many of these hits, and Pete Moore also doubled as co-producer with Robinson on several of them.

By 1969, Robinson wanted to retire from touring to focus on raising his two children with his wife Claudette, and on his duties as Motown's vice president, a job he had taken on by the mid-1960s after Esther Gordy Edwards had left the position. However, the success of the group's "Tears of a Clown" made Robinson stay with the group until 1972. His last performance with the group was in July 1972 in Washington, D.C.

Solo career

After a year of retirement, Robinson announced his comeback with the release of the eponymous Smokey album, in 1973. The album included the Miracles tribute song, "Sweet Harmony", and the hit ballad "Baby Come Close". In 1974, Robinson's second album, Pure Smokey, was released but failed to produce hits. Robinson struggled to compete with his former collaborators Marvin Gaye, Stevie Wonder and former Temptations member Eddie Kendricks, as all three had multiple hit singles during this period.

Former Beatle George Harrison featured the track "Pure Smokey" on his 1976 album Thirty Three & 1/3 as a tribute to Robinson. (Harrison's fellow Beatles John Lennon and Paul McCartney were also fans of Robinson's songwriting and the group covered "You Really Gotta Hold on Me" on their second UK album With the Beatles and US album The Beatles' Second Album, respectively.)

Robinson answered his critics the following year with A Quiet Storm, released in 1975. The album launched three singles – the number-one R&B hit "Baby That's Backatcha", "The Agony & The Ecstasy" and "Quiet Storm". However, Robinson's solo career suffered from his work as Motown's vice president, and his own music took the backseat. As a result, several albums including Smokey's Family Robinson, Deep in My Soul, Love Breeze and Smokin, saw poor promotion and received bad reviews. At this point Robinson relied on other writers and producers to help him with his albums.

Following these albums, Robinson got out of a writer's block after his close collaborator Marv Tarplin, who joined him on the road in 1973 after Robinson left the Miracles, presented him a tune he had composed on his guitar. Robinson later wrote the lyrics that became his first solo top ten Pop single, "Cruisin'". The song hit number one in Cash Box and peaked at number four on the Billboard Hot 100.  It also became his first solo number one in New Zealand. Robinson would follow a similar approach with his next album, Warm Thoughts, which produced another top 40 hit, "Let Me Be the Clock", though it did not repeat the success of "Cruisin'".

In 1981, Robinson topped the charts again with another sensual ballad, "Being with You", which was another number one hit in Cash Box and peaked at number two on the Billboard Hot 100. It also hit number one in the UK Singles Chart, becoming his most successful single to date. The Gold-plus parent album sparked a partnership with George Tobin and with Tobin, Robinson released his next several Motown albums, Yes It's You Lady, which produced the hit "Tell Me Tomorrow", Touch the Sky and Essar. In 1983, Robinson teamed up with fellow Motown label mate Rick James recording the R&B ballad, "Ebony Eyes".

In 1987, following a period of personal and professional issues, Robinson made a comeback with the album, One Heartbeat and the singles, "Just to See Her" and "One Heartbeat", which were Top 10 hits on Billboards Pop, Soul, and Adult Contemporary charts.  They were aided by popular music videos.  "Just to See Her" won Robinson his first Grammy Award in 1988. The album became one of his most successful ever, selling over 900,000 copies in the United States alone. In the same year, Robinson released One Heartbeat, the UK group ABC released a tribute song, "When Smokey Sings".

He was inducted as a solo artist to the Rock and Roll Hall of Fame in 1988, later igniting controversy as the committee had inducted only Robinson and not members of his group, the Miracles, which Robinson was personally offended by. In 2012, however, the committee rectified the mistake announcing that the group would be inducted on their own merit. Though Robinson was not listed as an inductee, he was due to induct his former group at the ceremony in April 2012.

After Motown was sold off to MCA in 1988, Robinson relinquished his position as vice president. Following the release of the album, Love Smokey, in 1990, Robinson left Motown for a deal with SBK Records in 1991. However, the album, Double Good Everything failed to chart. Robinson remained virtually quiet during the nineties (though he would make a notable cameo appearance in The Temptations 1998 miniseries), making a brief comeback in 1999 when he re-signed with Motown and issued the album, Intimate, which included the song "Easy to Love".

In 2003, he once again split ties with Motown, releasing the gospel album, Food for the Soul on Liquid 8 Records in 2004. In 2004 Robinson sang the main title theme song "Colorful World" to the American children's animated series ToddWorld for Discovery Kids, TLC and Mike Young Productions. Two years later, Robinson released the standards album, Timeless Love, in 2006 on Universal Records.

In 2009, he issued the album, Time Flies When You're Having Fun on his own label, Robso Records.  It reached  number 59 on the Billboard album chart, his highest showing since One Heartbeat. He subsequently released "Now And Then" in 2010, which peaked at number 131.

Smokey & Friends was released in mid-August 2014. It was an album of duets, including songs with Elton John, Linda Ronstadt and James Taylor. It reached number 12 on the Billboard album chart.

Christmas Everyday was Robinson's first post-Miracles Christmas album, and was released on November 10, 2017. In 2018, he appeared on an episode of CMT Crossroads alongside country singer Cam.

In April 2017, Robinson visited Fremont-Lopez Elementary School in Stockton, California, where he served as a designated arts mentor under Turnaround Arts.

On July 31, 2018, Robinson appeared as a special guest on the Fox network's show Beat Shazam as a special guest.

Robinson appeared on the song "Make It Better" from Anderson Paak's 2019 album Ventura.

In 2023, Robinson announced that he would release his first album in almost a decade in April 2023. The nine-track album will be called Gasms, and will feature entirely new music. The first single from the album, called "If We Don't Have Each Other", was already available on streaming service by January 2023.

Personal life
Robinson married a fellow Miracles member, Claudette Rogers, in 1959. The couple had two children: a son, Berry Robinson (born 1968), named after Motown's first label founder Berry Gordy; and a daughter, Tamla Robinson (born 1971), named after the original "Tamla" label set up by Gordy that would eventually become Motown.

Robinson also had a son named Trey (born 1984) with another woman during his marriage to Claudette. After Robinson admitted to having fathered a child with a woman other than his wife, he filed for legal separation and later filed for divorce. The divorce was finalized in 1986. The Robinsons had also separated in 1974; during that separation, Robinson engaged in an extramarital affair that inspired the song "The Agony & The Ecstasy" (later featured on A Quiet Storm).

Robinson married Frances Gladney in May 2002. They own a home in Pittsburgh and use it as a winery.

Robinson has not eaten red meat since 1972. He practices Transcendental Meditation. Robinson is notable for having golden green eyes, which he believes were passed down from his French great-grandmother.

Discography

Awards and accolades

On February 22, 1983, Smokey was awarded an individual star on The Hollywood Walk of Fame.
Four years later, in 1987, Robinson was inducted to the Rock & Roll Hall of Fame. Robinson's single "Just to See Her"" from the One Heartbeat album was awarded the 1988 Grammy Award for Grammy Award for Best Male R&B Vocal Performance. This was Robinson's first Grammy Award. One year later, in 1989, he was inducted to the Songwriter's Hall of Fame

In 1993, Robinson was awarded a medal at the National Medal of Arts. Two years before, he won the Heritage Award at the Soul Train Music Awards. In 2005, Robinson was voted into the Michigan Rock and Roll Legends Hall of Fame. At its 138th Commencement Convocation in May 2006, Howard University conferred on Robinson the degree of Doctor of Music, honoris causa. In December 2006 Robinson was one of five Kennedy Center honorees, along with Dolly Parton, Zubin Mehta, Steven Spielberg and Andrew Lloyd Webber.

On March 20, 2009, the Miracles were finally honored as a group with a star on the Hollywood Walk of Fame. Smokey was present with original Miracles members Bobby Rogers, Pete Moore, (Bobby's cousin) Claudette Rogers, and Gloria White, accepting for her husband, the late Ronnie White, whose daughter Pamela and granddaughter Maya were there representing him as well. Smokey's replacement, 1970s Miracles lead singer Billy Griffin, was also honored.

Controversially, original Miracle Marv Tarplin was not honored, against the wishes of his fellow Miracles and the group's fans, who felt that he should have also been there to share the honor.
Later, Tarplin did receive his star. He was also inducted with the rest of the original Miracles, Bobby Rogers, Pete Moore, Ronnie White, and Claudette Robinson, into the Rock and Roll Hall of Fame in 2012, 25 years after Robinson's controversial solo induction in 1987. He was also awarded Society of Singers Lifetime Achievement Award in 2011.

In 2009, Robinson received an honorary doctorate degree — along with Linda Ronstadt — and gave a commencement speech at Berklee College of Music's commencement ceremony. In 2015, he was given a BET Lifetime Achievement Award.

In 2016, Robinson received the Library of Congress' Gershwin Prize for Popular Song; and, on August 21, 2016, he was inducted into the Rhythm & Blues Hall of Fame in his hometown of Detroit.

In 2019, he received the Golden Plate Award of the American Academy of Achievement presented by Awards Council members Jimmy Page and Peter Gabriel.

References

Further reading

External links

 Smokey Robinson interview by Pete Lewis, 'Blues & Soul' December 1992
 Interview on  Fresh Air
 
 Smokey Robinson's page at soulwalking.co.uk
 Smokey Robinson Biography and Update at SoulTracks
 Smokey Robinson at cosmopolis.ch
 
 
 Smokey Robinson Wines

1940 births
Living people
African-American male singers
African-American record producers
African-American songwriters
American child singers
American male pop singers
American male singer-songwriters
American music industry executives
American people of French descent
American rhythm and blues singers
American rhythm and blues singer-songwriters
American soul singers
American tenors
Child pop musicians
Singers from Detroit
American gospel singers
Grammy Legend Award winners
Grammy Lifetime Achievement Award winners
Kennedy Center honorees
The Miracles members
Motown artists
Record producers from Michigan
United States National Medal of Arts recipients
Northern High School (Detroit, Michigan) alumni
Singer-songwriters from Michigan